Aneel Murarka (born 7 May 1967) is the managing director of Mirachem Industries. He is a philanthropist with an interest in students’ welfare and education.
He is very closely associated with NGOs, including ALERT India (which works for Leprosy Control), NASEOH, which works for underprivileged children, and the National Association for the Blind (NAB).

Biography 
Murarka was born Mumbai to Kashiprasad and Meena Murarka. He had a modest upbringing; his grandfather was an army man during the Indian independence movement, while his father was the first one to bring business into the family.

He studied commerce at Mithibai College and Chinai College, after which he joined his father at MiraChem Industries. He was involved in the process of production and dispatching of products. His father trained him to look after the operations of the company. Under his leadership, the company expanded from a medium enterprise to a corporate, and was able to extend services beyond borders to tap the export market. The company offered eco-friendly chemicals for the textile industry, thus encouraging sustainable practices.

Philanthropic activities 
Murarka is known for spearheading an array of social and humanitarian initiatives PAN India. With his son, he founded Ample Mission, an organization that specializes in Intellectual Property-based events and organizes awards programmes. It facilitates events for social causes through performance that involves film stars and renowned personalities across fields.

Murarka has also engaged in several charitable activities influencing education, healthcare, and improving living conditions. He is officially appointed as the Ambassador of the Swachh Bharat Abhiyaan, an initiative to clean the infrastructure of small communities in India. He is actively involved in supporting NGOs, including the Indian Development Foundation, Narayani Dham (SAMRPAN), NASEOH, and Rajasthani Mandal. He also produced an anti-smoking film, 11minutes.

Awards and recognition 
 He honoured by former president of India Dr. APJ Abdul Kalam at held event in Guru Nanak College, Mumbai.
 Bharat Ratna Dr. Ambedkar Award for social activism, and businessman of the year at the 5th edition of Bharat Ratna Dr. Ambedkar Awards 2015.
 Honoured with "MAKE IN INDIA AWARD" by BHARAT NIRMAN Foundation
 Honoured with Ahimsa Award 2017 for Social Service by the Vice President of India Shri M Venkaiah Naidu ji and Acharya Dr. Lokeshjee Muni at the Ahimsa Diwas Samaroh.
 Society Achievers Award 2018 for Social Work presented by Industrialist Kumaramanglam Birla.
 Society Leadership Award 2017 presented by Industrialist Gautam Singhania
 Honoured with Bihar Mitra Award at the hands of Maharashtra CM Devendra Fadnavis and DY CM Bihar Mr. Sushil Kumar Modi.
 He has been awarded an honorary doctorate by for his extensive work for philanthropic causes.

Writings 

Murarka has written five books. Creating Ripples is the story of his father Kaashi Murarka, from his humble beginning to his rise as an industrialist. Remembrance is a biography dedicated to Shri Chiranjilal Murarka, his grandfather. Navashakti is a biography of his mother Meena Murarka. The fourth one is of his grandmother Badamidevi C. Murarka. Spiritual Awareness is a compilation of writings by Prof. V A Shenai.

Personal life 
Aneel Murarka is married to Sangeeta Murarka and has one son Sidhaant Murarka. He lives in a joint family and resides in Goregaon, Mumbai.

References

External links 
 
 Official site

Living people
Businesspeople from Mumbai
Indian Hindus
Indian industrialists
Indian philanthropists
1967 births